Karine Sergerie (born February 1, 1985) is the 2007 world champion in women's lightweight (under 63 kg) taekwondo. She is Canada's first female world champion in the sport.

Biography

Sergerie was born in Sainte-Catherine, Quebec, Canada. Her father and coach, Rejean, introduced her to karate at age five. She competed in karate from 1992–1998. He continued to coach her when she took an interest in taekwondo after her older brother took up the sport. She is the six-time consecutive national champion (2002–2007). She is also a graduate of Vanier College in Montreal.

Career
Sergerie won a silver medal at the 2003 World Taekwondo Championships. Despite this accomplishment, she did not qualify for the 2004 Summer Olympics because of a "contradiction in the selection process". One set of requirements said she needed to win a gold at the Pan-American Games to qualify, while another one did not. Although she did win a bronze medal at the 2003 Pan-Am Games, the Taekwondo Federation of Canada ruled it was not enough.

Sergerie was part of the three member 2008 Canadian Olympic team at the Summer Olympic Games in Taekwondo along with Ivett Gonda and Sébastien Michaud, and also represented Canada in the 2012 Summer Olympics.

In 2008, Karine advanced to the final where she competed against Hwang Kyung-Seon for the gold medal.
Her silver medal is Canada's best Olympic placing in the sport.

Career Highlights

2008 Beijing Summer Olympics: Silver
2007 World Taekwondo Championships: Gold 
2007 Pan American Games: Gold
2007 Canadian Senior National Championships: Gold
2006 Pan American Championships: Gold
2006 Commonwealth Taekwondo Championships: Gold 
2006 Canadian Senior National Championships: Gold
2005 World Taekwondo Championships: Bronze
2005 Canadian Senior National Championships: Gold
2004 Canadian Senior National Championships: Gold
2003 World Taekwondo Championships: Silver
2003 Canadian Senior National Championships: Gold
2002 Canadian Senior National Championships: Gold

Awards
2009 Inducted Into the Official Taekwondo Hall of Fame
Recipient of the 2005 National Championships Most Valuable Player Award.
The 2005 Taekwondo Spirit award at the National Championships.
2006 Most Valuable Player at the Pan Am Championships.
2008 Athlete of the Year by Gala Sports-Québec.

References

Karine Sergerie 2008 Beijing Olympic Team Profile
2007 Pan American Games Hopefuls for team Canada in Taekwondo

External links
Karine Sergerie 2007 World Championships clip on Youtube

1985 births
Living people
Olympic taekwondo practitioners of Canada
Canadian female taekwondo practitioners
Taekwondo practitioners at the 2007 Pan American Games
Taekwondo practitioners at the 2008 Summer Olympics
Taekwondo practitioners at the 2012 Summer Olympics
Olympic silver medalists for Canada
Olympic medalists in taekwondo
Medalists at the 2008 Summer Olympics
Pan American Games gold medalists for Canada
Pan American Games medalists in taekwondo
World Taekwondo Championships medalists
Medalists at the 2007 Pan American Games
21st-century Canadian women